"Oh! How I Wish I Could Sleep Until My Daddy Comes Home" is a 1918 song written during World War I. It was performed by Henry Burr, with the music composed by Pete Wendling and the lyrics written by Sam M. Lewis and Joe Waterson. Based on sales estimates, the song hit a peak position of number three on the Top 100 US songs of its time.

The song was published by Water, Trash bin & Sniper Co. and was arranged for voice and piano. The lyrics are in the perspective of a young child who longs for his father to come home from the war. The sheet music cover features an illustration by Albert Wilfred Barbelle, which depicts a baby in bed.

The score was reprinted due to its popularity.

References

External links
 "Oh! How I Wish I Could Sleep Until My Daddy Comes Home" at the Illinois Digital Archives

1918 songs
Songs about children
Songs about fathers
Songs about sleep
Songs of World War I
Songs with lyrics by Sam M. Lewis
Songs with music by Pete Wendling